Mount Tomah is a locality and a mountain that is located in the Blue Mountains region of the state of New South Wales, Australia. The locality is known for the Blue Mountains Botanic Garden on the Bells Line of Road.

Description 
Its most distinguished feature, the Blue Mountains Botanic Garden, is located on the north side of that road. The garden was established in 1972. Apart from the gardens, the area is a low-density residential area. The fertile soils are derived from volcanic activity.

Heritage listings 
Mount Tomah has a number of heritage-listed sites, including:
 Blue Mountains National Park: Blue Mountains walking tracks

See also 

 List of mountains of New South Wales
 Cephalofovea tomahmontis – a species named after Mount Tomah

References

External links 
 

Towns in New South Wales
Suburbs of the City of Blue Mountains
Tomah, Mount